The 1986–87 Maltese Premier League was the 7th season of the Maltese Premier League, and the 72nd season of top-tier football in Malta. It was contested by 8 teams, and Hamrun Spartans F.C. won the championship.

League standings

Second Place tie-breaker
With both Valletta and Zurrieq level on 16 points, a play-off match was conducted to qualification for the UEFA Cup

Results

References
Malta - List of final tables (RSSSF)

Maltese Premier League seasons
Malta
1986–87 in Maltese football